Kings Bay may refer to:

Svalbard, Norway
Kongsfjorden, a fjord previously known as Kings Bay
Ny-Ålesund, a town known as Kings Bay until 1925
Kings Bay (company), a Norwegian government enterprise that runs the Ny-Ålesund research facility
Kings Bay Affair, the political aftermath of a mining accident which caused a cabinet to resign

United States
Kings Bay Base, Georgia, a census-designated place in Camden County, Georgia
Kings Bay (Florida), a bay on Crystal River (Florida)
Kings Bay (Georgia), a bay in Georgia
Naval Submarine Base Kings Bay, a United States Navy base in Camden County, in southeast Georgia